The Simpele railway station is located in the municipality of Rautjärvi, Finland, in the urban area and municipal seat of Simpele. It is located along the Kouvola–Joensuu railway, and its neighboring stations are Imatra in the west and Parikkala in the east.

Services 
Simpele is served by long-distance trains (InterCity and Pendolino) that use the Kouvola–Joensuu line as part of their route.

External links 
 Train departures and arrivals at Simpele on Finrail

References 

Rautjärvi
Railway stations in South Karelia